Bolivia competed at the 1988 Summer Olympics in Seoul, South Korea. Seven competitors, six men and one woman, took part in twelve events in six sports.

Competitors
The following is the list of number of competitors in the Games.

Athletics

Men's 10.000 metres
 Policarpio Calizaya
 First Round — 30:35.01 (→ did not advance)

Men's Marathon 
 Juan Camacho — 2:34.41 (→ 69th place)

Cycling

One male cyclists represented Bolivia in 1988.

Men's sprint
 Bailón Becerra

Men's 1 km time trial
 Bailón Becerra

Men's points race
 Bailón Becerra

Fencing

One male fencer represented Bolivia in 1988.

Men's sabre
 Pedro Bleyer

Judo

Men's Competition
 Ricardo Belmonte

Swimming

Women's 50m Freestyle
 Katerine Moreno
 Heat – 29.42 (→ did not advance, 46th place)

Women's 100m Freestyle
 Katerine Moreno
 Heat – 1:05.39 (→ did not advance, 54th place)

Women's 100m Backstroke
 Katerine Moreno
 Heat – 1:14.42 (→ did not advance, 38th place)

Women's 100m Breaststroke
 Katerine Moreno
 Heat – 1:22.62 (→ did not advance, 40th place)

Weightlifting

Men's Competition
 Hernán Cortez

References

External links
Official Olympic Reports

Nations at the 1988 Summer Olympics
1988
Summer Olympics

pl:Boliwia na Letnich Igrzyskach Olimpijskich 1972